Mike Bigornia (born 16 May 1950 in Bangued, Abra, Philippines) is a Filipino poet, editor, fictionist and translator. Bigornia was educated at the University of the East where he finished political science.

He was the immediate past chairman of the Unyon ng Mga Manunulat ng Pilipinas (UMPIL), and the recipient of several Palanca Awards.

He also won National Book Awards from the Manila Critics Circle for his collection of prose poems, Prosang Itim (Anvil) and Punta-Blanko.
Bigornia, the Makata ng Taon in 1986, was a founding member of the Gallan sa Arte at Tula (GAT), along with fellow poets Virgilio Almario and Teo Antonio. He also worked as managing director for Phoenix Publishing House.

References
 University of the East http://www.ue.edu.ph
 University of the East Diamond Jubilee : What is Our Role?. Published by University of the East, Dawn, 2006
 60 Outstanding Alumni - UE Today, The Diamond Jubilee Awards 2006: A Celebration of Achievement, Published by University of the East, UE Today, September 2006 /

External links
 Literary news and works from the UP community.
 Filipino Writers' Organizations

Filipino writers
People from Abra (province)
People from Manila
Tagalog-language writers
Writers from Metro Manila
University of the East alumni
1950 births
Living people